Shai Cohen (b.1968, in Haifa) is an Israeli music educator and composer of contemporary classical music.

Biography
Dr. Shai Cohen is a composer-researcher, educator, and jazz performer, ex-chairman of the Israeli Composers' League (2012-17, 2019-22), and an active member in ACUM.  He specializes in diverse fields ranging from free improvisation to electronic and contemporary classical music.

His music has been played at events including "Asian Contemporary Music Festival" (2003/Japan, 2009/Korea, 2012/Israel, 2013/Singapore, 2016/Vietnam, 2018/Taiwan), ISCM, contemporary music festival (2006/Moscow Autumn, 2019/Estonia), "Aberdeen Music Prize" (2011), 34th Annual "Bowling Green New Music Festival" (2013), "Israeli Music Festival" (2004, 2012) and performed by musicians and ensembles like the Vietnam National Symphony Orchestra (Vietnam), SNU Symphony Orchestra (Korea), the Moscow Contemporary Music Ensemble (Moscow), members of the BBC Scottish Symphony Orchestra (Scotland), Tokyo National University of Fine Arts and Music (Japan), T'ang Quartet (Singapore), St Andrews New Music Ensemble (Scotland), Ensemble Kaprizma (Israel), Israel Contemporary Players,  the Arab & Jewish ensembles of the Israeli Philharmonic Orchestra, The Tel Aviv Soloists Ensemble, The Israel Kibbutz Orchestra, Israel Sinfonietta orchestra of Beer-Sheva and many others.

Cohen is the director of the Music, Technology and Visual Media Program at Bar-Ilan University teaching courses in Audio Synthesis, Advanced Studio Recording, Live Electronics Workshop, Arduino Workshop, Max/MSP/jitter Applications, Sound Engineering, Audio Applications, and Music Cognition Workshop. He is also a lecturer in the Levinsky College of Education and in the Open University Music Departments.

Selected Musical works

 "Who does not play the dice?", Comprovisation for the C Barré Ensemble, inspired by "The Lottery in Babylon" by Jorge Luis Borges.  The 7th International Conference on Technologies for Music Notation and Representation (TENOR), 9/10/11 May 2022, Marseille, France.
 “ER=EPR” for French Horn and Live electronics. Premiere: Bram Vanoverberghe, MIRY Concertzaal the Royal Conservatory of Arts Ghent, Belgium. March 1, 2022. Also work chosen for the 2021 ISCM WNMD in Shanghai and Nanning, China.
 “3 electronic pieces - (Conversation with Cage, let vectors = {}, Chapter 01)”. Works Chosen for the 2021 SONIC MATTER festival, Kunstraum Walcheturm, Zürich. 04.12.2021 - 05.12.2021
 “Remez” for Trombone and Piano. the winner of the V International Contest of Musical Composition Royal Academy of Fine Arts of San Carlos, 2021. Valencia, Spain. Slide Trombone: José Vicente Faubel, Piano: Carlos Apellániz. Tuesday, February 8 at 7:00 p.m. in the Assembly Hall of the Royal Academy of Fine Arts of San Carlos.
 "A LEAP INTO THE DARK". Peter Katina - Accordion, Shai Cohen - Electronics, Slovenia (Mar. 2021).
 "Conversation with Cage". Conversation with the cage about the social situation in the face of the covid-19. John Cage, Nadav Lev, Shai Cohen. Tel Aviv-Yafo, Israel (Mar. 2021).
 “Secret Scripture”. for Meitar Ensemble, Suzanne Dellal Centre For Dance and Theater, Tel Aviv-Yafo, Israel (Mar. 2020).
 "Even the most unfounded story had to be made up". Hila Zamir, Humay Gasimzade, Shai Cohen. Bowling Green State University, USA (Mar. 2021).
 "Entanglement" for conductor and interactive 2D point map. Conductor, Ilan Volkov, Conception, Composition and Video, Shai Cohen, Tel Aviv-Yafo, Israel (Aug. 2020).
 "Three Glances", for Viola solo, Nitai Zori - Viola, Shai Cohen - Electronics, Tel Aviv-Yafo, Israel (July. 2020).
 "Flatten the Curve", for the Modern Art Orchestra, "ART OF VIRUS" challenge. Level 10 descendent from Péter Eötvös, Hungary (July. 2020). 
 "Odd kind of Sympathy", for Meitar Ensemble, conductor Tom Karni, the Israeli Conservatory of Music, Tel Aviv-Yafo, Israel (June. 2020).
 "Darkness", for amplified ensemble and fixed media electronics and video. Dan Weinstein, Amos Elkana, Oded Geizhals. HaTeiva, Tel Aviv-Yafo, Israel (Jan. 2020)
 "Epistola de ignoto", for amplified ensemble and fixed media electronics. Ensemble airborne extended, The well-tempered detune, International Conference on contemporary music for early instruments. Bar-Ilan University, Israel (Jan. 2020)
 "4 lines", for Prepared amplified Snare Drum and fixed-media electronics. Geizhals Oded, CNMAT Berkeley UC, California, USA (Dec. 2019).
 "The edge of Irrationality", for Electric Guitar and Drum Set. Lev Nadav and Geizhals Oded, Spectrum, NYC (Dec. 2019).
 "Mechanical Expressiveness", for Flute & Alto Flute head joints and electronics. Antonella Bini, Italy (Nov. 2019).
 "Signs", for voice and piano. "Israeli Music Festival", The Jerusalem Music Centre (Oct. 2019).
 "I saw a rainbow in a puddle", For Harp solo and electronics. Olga Moitlis (Sept. 2019).
 "Seven Cadenzas", for string quartet and electronics, commissioned by Carmel Quartet (June 2019).
 "Noumenon", for ensemble with audiovisuals, commissioned by the International Society for Contemporary Music (ISCM), Ensemble for New Music Tallinn (May. 2019). 
 "I Heard a Fly Buzz... When I Died" For Voice, Percussion, and ensemble. The 'Israel Contemporary Players, Tel Aviv Museum of Art (Mar. 2019).
 "Pain expands the Time" For Chamber ensemble. Ensemble Wiener Collage, Buchman Mehta School of Music, Tel Aviv (Dec. 2018).
 "I heard the old man say..." For Chamber ensemble. The 3rd “Asia – Europe” New Music Festival in Vietnam (Nov. 2018).
 "Can you hear the wooden man" For percussion ensemble. Ju Percussion Group, The 35th Asian Composers League Conference and Festival, Taiwan (Oct. 2018).
 "Absence of yesterday" For Flute, Clarinet, Cello, and Piano. Meitar Ensemble, the Israeli Conservatory of Music, Tel Aviv-Yafo, Israel (Oct. 2018). 
 "Ancient Scripts" for Accordion and Electronics. Peter Katina, Slovenia (Sept. 2018). 
 "Tfila" for Alto Sax and live-electronics. Jonathan Chazan, Hateiva Tel Aviv-Yafo, Israel (June 2018). 
 "Messages from..." for young concert band and Vibraphone. Hagar Shahal, the Israeli Conservatory of Music, Tel Aviv, Israel (June 2018).
 "Parenthetically" for piano and live electronics. Hagai Yodan, 60 SECONDS PROJECT! Israel (June 2018).
 "Magic Spells and Ancient Ritual" for Violin solo. Moshe Aharonov, Pushing the Boundaries of Musical Expression. International Conference on Research in Music and Creativity. IRMaM, Bar-Ilan University, Israel (Nov. 2017).
 "Moment of silence" for sax quartet and Tape. The Tel Aviv Saxophone Quartet, the Israel Conservatory of Music, Tel Aviv, Israel (July 2017).
 "The Double" for violin solo strings and Tape. Ensemble Moscheles, conductor Jan Rezek, Sólisté Tomáš Tuláček, Muzeum Bedřicha Smetany, Prague, Czech (June 2017).
 "Time dilation" for piano solo. Hagai Yodan, Tel Aviv, Israel (May 2017).
 "A second glance of rows already written" for mezzo-soprano and cello. Bracha Kol Mezzo and Yoni Gotlibovich, Levinsky College of Education, Tel Aviv, Israel (Jan. 2017).
 "Disegno" for Flute and Chamber Ensemble. Ensemble New Babylon, BREMEN, Germany (Oct. 2016).
 "Seven flashes of thoughts" for orchestra.  Vietnam National Symphony Orchestra (VNSO), Hanoi Opera House, the 34th ACL Festival & Conference in Vietnam. Conductor Mr. Honna Tetsuji. (Oct. 2016).
 "Encounters" Duet for Trumpet and Piano. Yigal Meltzer, Amit Dolberg, the Israeli Conservatory of Music, Tel Aviv, Israel (Oct. 2016).
 "A Tale of Nature" for Solo electric guitar and triggered-tape. Alain Blesing, USA (Aug. 2016). 
 "Tachbir" for piano solo. Ofra Yitzhaki, the Israel Conservatory of Music, Tel Aviv, Israel (Feb. 2016).
 "A Deafening Silence" For chamber orchestra. Pierre-Andre Valade: conductor, Meitar Ensemble, EME Festival Tel Aviv, Israel (Jan.2016).
 "Ma-hod" for cor anglais and percussion quartet. Benjamin Fischer and Ensemble New Babylon, BREMEN, Germany (Dec. 2015).
 "Like a mountain stream" for soprano and vibraphone. Geizhals Oded and Aronstein Einat, The Abu-Gosh Vocal Festival, Jerusalem, Israel (Oct. 2015). 
 "Episode II" for amplified cello, soundtrack and live electronics. Markus Hohti, Oulu, Finland (Sept. 2015). 
 "Narrative Enigma" for viola solo and ensemble. Ensemble Meitar, Pierre-André Valade, the center for new music, Tel Aviv, Israel (Apr. 2015). 
 "Mistorin" for accordions. Ljubljana, Slovenia (Oct. 2014).
 "I have outlived the night" for mezzo‐soprano, a digital narrator, and double projectors. Angelica Cathariou, Greece (Aug. 2014).
 "Mipnej Mah?"  For violin, clarinet, cello, and piano. Based on themes from J. Engel, op. 35, Hadibuk.  Orit Orbach, Levinsky College of Education, Tel Aviv, Israel (June 2014).
 "Variation on an old Story" For Violin, soundtrack and live electronics. Cordelia Hagmann, HaTeiva. Tel Aviv-Yafo, Israel (May 2014). 
 "Parmenides dialogue" for flute and marimba. Elisabeth Wentland, Oded Geizhals, Felicja Blumental, Israel (Mar. 2014).
 "Apsis" for Piccolo, Baritone Sax, and Tuba. Noa Even, Elise Roy, Mary MacKinnon, University of Bowling, Green State, USA (Jan. 2014).
 "And the echo died away" for string orchestra and vocals. Tel Aviv Soloist Orchestra, Barak Tal, Hadas Faran-Asia, Shahar Lavi, Israel (Dec. 2013).
 "Ragnarok" For chamber orchestra. Sally Beamish, St Andrews University, Scotland (Nov. 2013).
 "Games, Songs and Dances" for string quartet. T'ang Quartet, ACL Asian Contemporary Music Festival 2013, SINGAPORE (Sept. 2013).
 "pANIkA" for ensemble and electronics. Ensemble Meitar, the center for new music, Tel Aviv, Israel (July 2013).
 "Boundaries" for violin solo and real-time graphics control sound processing. Moshe Aharonov, 30th Festival & Conference of the ACL (Oct. 2012).
 "Shochenet Basade" for Big-band, Ethnic soloist singer, Choir, and Oud. The Israeli Music Festival (Sept. 2012).
 "Pride" for piano and voice. Revital Raviv, Eyal Bat, Levinsky College of Education, Tel Aviv, Israel (Apr. 2012).
 On another note" for soprano sax, piano, bass, and perc.  Reeds&Mallets ensemble, Hateiva Tel Aviv-Yafo, Israel (Mar. 2012).
 "Circles of Time" for trumpet and string quartet. The BBC Scottish Symphony Orchestra, University of Aberdeen, Music Prize Gala Concert (Nov. 2011). 
 "Liminal Experiences" for ensemble and tape. Meitar Ensemble, Jerusalem Theatre, the Israel music festival (Oct. 2011). 
 "Schizophrenia" for Alto Sax, Marimba (and vib). Reeds&Mallets duo, Tel Aviv, Israel (June 2011).
 "Nuance" for Harp and Live electronics. Olga Moitlis, Haifa, Israel (June 2011). 
 "Second Message from Dmitri" for piano and string quartet, Israel Philharmonic Quartet, Levinsky College of Education, Tel Aviv, Israel (May 2011).
 "Captured" for ensemble, tape and live electronics. The Israel Contemporary Players, Zsolt Nagy, Tel Aviv, Israel (Jan. 2010).
 "From earth to wind" for accordion and narrator. Claudia Buder and Elija Schwarz, Leipzig, Germany (June 2009).
 "Echoes of Eternity" for violin solo and orchestra. SNU Symphony Orchestra, Seung-Lim Kim, Seyoung Lee, Asian-Pacific Contemporary Music Festival in Korea (Apr. 2009). 
 "DSCH" for Ensemble. Moscow Contemporary Music Ensemble, Alexei Vinogradov, Moscow, Russia (Nov. 2006).

Sound Installation and film

 Real-Time Music Composition With colors and movements tracking (2008) a project in memorial of Yossi Banai, premiered in Bar-Ilan University, Duration: Free"
 Music for documentary film wins Haifa international film festival (2005) with the support of The Second Authority for Television and Radio.

Scientific Research
The scope of Cohen's research   includes all aspects of composition and improvisation in music. Both areas strive to expand musical expression beyond music scores. That extension is reflected in the development of unique graphic notation methods and designated technological environments for concert context. Another area is the development of innovative teaching-learning environments based on musical technology tools built specifically in programs such as MAX/MSP or SuperCollider.

Honors and awards
 2022 - Menachem Avidom Prize Achievement Award for the piece “Darkness” - An ACUM Prize. Society of Authors, Composers and Music Publishers in Israel.
 2021 - “Understanding the inter-personal neural mechanisms of synchronization in young adults with ASD: Employing dyadic drumming as a platform for a multimodal investigation of social function”; Israel Science Foundation 2021-25
 2020 - Israel Lottery Council for Culture & Arts.
 2018 - Bar Ilan University rector grant, towards forming a research group and a conference on music, creativity, and technology.
 2017 - Research grant in the framework of the President's Fund, Levinsky College of Education.
 2011 - Aberdeen Music Prize for "Circles of Time" for Trumpet string quartet members of the BBC Scottish Symphony Orchestra in the University of Aberdeen Music Prize.
 2011 - Ministry of Culture and Sport, The Prime Minister's Prize for Music Achievement.
 2010 - Menachem Avidom Prize Achievement Award for the piece “Echoes of Eternity, Fantasia for violin solo and orchestra” - An ACUM Prize.

References

External links
 
 Article on sound sculpture (in Hebrew)
 Compositions & Scores
 Radio Interview, an internet radio station broadcasting from The Israeli Center for Digital Art in Holon, Israel

1968 births
Living people
Israeli composers